Arthur William Graham III (born July 31, 1941) is a former American football player.  He played professionally as a wide receiver in the American Football League (AFL) for six seasons with the Boston Patriots. He was named Patriots player of the year in 1963 after averaging 26.2 yards per catch and scoring five touchdowns. Drafted by both the Patriots and the Cleveland Browns, the Patriots offered him $10,000 to play for them. He played college football at Boston College.

His father Art (Skinny) Graham II was an outfielder for 21 games for the Boston Red Sox during the 1934-35 seasons.

Art Graham III averaged 26.1 yards per reception during his rookie season with the Boston Patriots.  Art  had a career best 167 yards receiving in the Patriots thrilling 25-24 last second victory over the Houston Oilers @ Fenway Park on 11-06-64.
He caught an 80-yard touchdowns pass from Babe Parilli in the Patriots 34-17 win over the Houston Oilers on 11-29-64.  Art made a game saving tackles on a long punt return by Hoot Gibson in the Patriots 17-14 win over the Oakland Raiders on 09-13-64.  Art also made a game saving tackle on a long punt return by Lance Alworth in the Patriots 33-28 win over the San Diego Chargers on 09-20-64.

Art held the Patriots Team Record for the most receptions in a game for 33 years.  He had 11 receptions for 134 yards and 2 touchdowns in the Patriots 27-27 tie with the Kansas City Chiefs on 11-20-66.  He caught a 22-yard touchdown pass, even though he was only wearing one shoe, in the Patriots 20-14 win over the Miami Dolphins on 11-27-66.  (It would take another 20 years before the Patriots would win another game played in Miami Florida)

Graham is a member of the Patriots' All-1960s (AFL) team.

See also
 List of American Football League players

References

1941 births
Living people
Sportspeople from Somerville, Massachusetts
Players of American football from Massachusetts
American football wide receivers
Boston College Eagles football players
Boston Patriots players
American Football League players